Loxostege phaeopteralis is a moth in the family Crambidae. It was described by George Hampson in 1913. It was described from Ron Island.

References

Moths described in 1913
Pyraustinae